WVRC Media  is a media corporation comprising radio stations and two radio networks based in the state of West Virginia. The company was known as the West Virginia Radio Corporation prior to a December 2021 rebranding.

The company is controlled by Greer Industries and its owners, the Raese family.

It was founded by Herbert and Agnes Greer, who signed on WAJR in 1940. Since 1972, John Raese and his two brothers have controlled the company; they are Herbert and Agnes' grandsons.

Radio markets
WVRC Media owns stations in seven separate areas in the state of West Virginia:

 Charleston
 Morgantown-Clarksburg-Fairmont
 Elkins-Buckhannon-Weston
 Cumberland-Keyser
 Beckley
 Martinsburg
 Berkeley Springs

West Virginia MetroNews
WVRC Media owns and operates the West Virginia MetroNews Network.  The network features 63 affiliates covering all 55 counties in West Virginia.

Stations owned by WVRC Media

Charleston

Morgantown-Clarksburg-Fairmont

Elkins-Buckhannon-Weston

Keyser-Cumberland

Beckley-Oak Hill

Martinsburg

Berkeley Springs

References

External links
 Official Website of West Virginia Radio Corporation
 West Virginia MetroNews

Privately held companies based in West Virginia
Radio broadcasting companies of the United States
Companies based in Morgantown, West Virginia
American companies established in 1940
1940 establishments in West Virginia